HMS Thornborough (K574), sometimes spelled Thornbrough, was a British Captain-class frigate of the Royal Navy in commission during World War II. Originally constructed as a United States Navy Buckley class destroyer escort, the ship served in the Royal Navy from 1943 to 1945.

Construction and transfer
The ship was laid down as the unnamed U.S. Navy destroyer escort DE-565 by Bethlehem-Hingham Shipyard, Inc., in Hingham, Massachusetts, on 22 September 1943 and launched on 13 November 1943. She was transferred to the United Kingdom upon completion on 31 December 1943.

Service history

Commissioned into service in the Royal Navy as the frigate HMS Thornborough (K574) on 31 December 1943 simultaneously with her transfer, the ship served on patrol and escort duty for the remainder of World War II.

The Royal Navy decommissioned Thornborough in 1945 and returned her to the U.S. Navy on 27 January 1947.

Disposal
The United States sold Thornborough on 24 April 1947 to a shipbuilding firm in Greece for scrapping.

References
Navsource Online: Destroyer Escort Photo Archive Thornbroough (DE-565) HMS Thornborough (K-574)
uboat.net HMS Thornborough (K 574)
Destroyer Escort Sailors Association DEs for UK
Captain Class Frigate Association HMS Thornborough K574 (DE 565)

External links
Photo gallery of HMS Thornborough (K574)

 

Captain-class frigates
Buckley-class destroyer escorts
World War II frigates of the United Kingdom
Ships built in Hingham, Massachusetts
1943 ships